Sycamore/Main Street, also known as The Asian District, is a station on the Valley Metro Rail line in Mesa, Arizona, United States. The station is located one block east of the intersection of Dobson Road and Main Street, in front of the former Tri City Mall. It was the original eastern terminus for Valley Metro Rail when the line opened in 2008. Adjacent to Mekong Plaza and other East Asian businesses, it serves as an access point to Mesa's Asian district. A large park and ride lot is located adjacent to the station's bus terminal on the north side of Main Street.

Ridership

Nearby landmarks
 East Valley Institute of Technology
 Mekong Plaza
 Mesa’s Asian District

References

External links
 Valley Metro map

Valley Metro Rail stations
Transportation in Mesa, Arizona
Railway stations in the United States opened in 2008
2008 establishments in Arizona
Buildings and structures in Mesa, Arizona